The Tenant (Spanish: El inquilino) is a 1957 Spanish drama film directed by José Antonio Nieves Conde and starring Fernando Fernán-Gómez about how difficult it was to find an affordable flat in Madrid. At the time it was banned by Spanish censors, and when it was re-released two years later, the film was edited, the dialogue was sanitized for political purposes, and the ending was changed to a happier one. It also failed at the box office.

In the 90's, an un-cut and uncensored print was discovered and restored by Filmoteca Española (Spanish Cinemateque). The film is now considered a classic.

Plot
The film takes a critical look at the issue of affordable housing in Madrid in the 1950s. It follows a family and their four children who are evicted from their flat. They try against the clock to find a new place to live while the one they are renting is torn down around them to make way for more expensive apartments. This social drama takes a daring approach during Francisco Franco's dictatorship to demonstrate the consequences of the rampant speculation in real estate that was taking place, and its effects on the lower and middles classes.

References

Bibliography 
 D'Lugo, Marvin. Guide to the Cinema of Spain. Greenwood Publishing, 1997.

External links
 

1957 films
1957 drama films
Spanish drama films
1950s Spanish-language films
Spain in fiction
Madrid in fiction
Spanish black-and-white films
Films directed by José Antonio Nieves Conde
1950s Spanish films